Fatos Pilkati (born 15 March 1951) is an Albanian shooter who competed at the 1972 Summer Olympic Games, he finished 24th.

References

1951 births
Living people
Albanian male sport shooters
Shooters at the 1972 Summer Olympics
Olympic shooters of Albania
Place of birth missing (living people)